Jackson Township is a township in Shelby County, Iowa. There are 196 people and 5.5 people per square mile in Jackson Township. The total area is 35.7 square miles.

References

Townships in Shelby County, Iowa
Townships in Iowa